Bush Mountain may refer to:

Bush Mountain (Alaska) in Prince of Wales-Hyder Census Area
Bush Mountain (California) in Santa Clara County
Bush Mountain (Pennsylvania) in Monroe County
Bush Mountain (Texas) in Culberson County
Bush Mountain (Greene County, Virginia)
Bush Mountain (Canada) in the Canadian Rockies
Bush Mountain (Rockingham County, Virginia)
Bush Mountains in Antarctica

References